The Wairarapa Railway Restoration Society is a railway heritage and preservation community group in the town of Carterton, in the Carterton District of Wairarapa on New Zealand's lower North Island.  The society has leased the Carterton railway station building through the Carterton District Council, though it is owned by the New Zealand Railways Corporation.

The society operates a museum from the station using volunteer labour, in which items of railway and other local historical interest are on display.  This includes static displays in the station building, as well as items of railway rolling stock which are stored in the station yard.  The Wairarapa Line runs through the site and the station also serves as a stop for the Wairarapa Connection passenger train.

History 

The impetus for the formation of the society was a proposal in the 1980s to demolish the historic station building at Carterton station and replace it with a more modern structure. Some concerned locals formed a group in 1990 with the goal of preventing this and restoring the station building. The museum opened a short time later.

After recovering from an arson attack in 1993, the refurbishment was finally completed in 1996.

Since then, the society has been responsible for maintenance of the buildings and fences at the site, and has worked with other local like-minded groups to acquire items of local historical interest for their archives and display in the Carterton Railway Museum at the Carterton railway station.

Affiliated groups 

The society is a member of the following organisations:
 Wairarapa Heritage Association
 Federation of Rail Organisations of New Zealand (FRONZ)

The society has also worked with the Carterton District Historical Society to acquire memorabilia for the museum, and has the support of the Carterton District Council and Rail Heritage Trust of New Zealand.

Museum 

The museum normally opens to the public on Sundays. Displays include:
 Rolling stock
 Photographs
 Railway artefacts
 Waingawa station building
 Railway signalling apparatus
 Railway motor trolleys
 A&G Price Shunting locomotive TR class 170 (TMS TR724) - stored offsite

Upon occasion, the society has been involved in or associated with plans to relocate other buildings of historical railway interest in the Wairarapa to the Carterton station precinct for preservation purposes, including the Greytown station goods shed (currently located on West Street in Greytown) and the class 6 passenger shelter building from Solway station.

References

External links 
 

Rail transport in Wellington
Railway museums in New Zealand
Museums in the Wellington Region
Carterton, New Zealand